Football Club de Martigues, known as FC Martigues or just Martigues, is a French professional football club which plays in the Championnat National, the third level of football in France.

The club plays at the Stade Francis Turcan, which has a capacity of 11,500, in Martigues. Their principal rivals are Istres.

History 
The club was founded in 1921 and played regional football until the early 1970s when they gained promotion to the professional Second Division.

The club's greatest achievement was winning promotion to the First Division in 1993. The club played for three seasons in the top flight, until it was relegated down to Ligue 2 in 1996. A failed attempt to win promotion at once was followed by relegation to the Championnat National (third level) in 1998. Two years later the club won promotion back to Second Division, but only remained at that level for two seasons.

In 2002, the club was relegated again and after another near miss at promotion in 2003, financial problems saw the club go into liquidation and reform in the Championnat de France Amateur. They finished the 2006–2007 season in the Championnat National as 14th. They were relegated to CFA in 2007–2008 season as 19th in the Championnat National.

The club was promoted back to the Championnat National in 2022, after ten years in lower divisions.

Current squad

Coaches

References

 
Association football clubs established in 1921
Sport in Bouches-du-Rhône
1921 establishments in France
Football clubs in Provence-Alpes-Côte d'Azur
Ligue 1 clubs